Mary Jessamyn West (July 18, 1902 – February 23, 1984) was an American author of short stories and novels, notably The Friendly Persuasion (1945). A Quaker from Indiana, she graduated from Fullerton Union High School in 1919 and Whittier College in 1923. There she helped found the Palmer Society in 1921. She received an honorary Doctor of Letters (Litt.D) degree from Whittier College in 1946. She received the Janet Heidinger Kafka Prize in 1975.

Personal life
West was born in Vernon, Indiana, to Eldo Roy West and Grace Anna Milhous. She was a second cousin of Richard Nixon through her mother's father. Her family left the state to move to California when she was the age of six. The family included two brothers and a sister, Merle, Myron, and Carmen. Growing up in the West Home in the same rural Yorba Linda region as Nixon, West attended a Sunday school class taught by Nixon's father, Frank, whom she described as "a fiery persuasive teacher." She later wrote that Frank Nixon's version of the social gospel inclined her politically toward socialism.

Work
West's first publication was in 1939, a short story called 99.6 about her experiences in the sanitarium. Her early success came from publishing short stories in literary journals.  Her first book concerned Indiana Quakers, despite the fact that she grew up and lived during her adult life in California. Asked about this in an interview, she said, "I write about Indiana because knowing little about it, I can create it." Comparing herself to other authors who created fictional universes, she remarked: 
"Roth wrote The Breast. Would you ask him how he could do this since he had never been a breast? Adams wrote Watership Down. Would you ask him how he could do this since he admitted his rabbit knowledge came from a book about rabbits? ... And those hobbits!... I am a bigger risk-taker than these others. The Hoosiers can contradict me. No rabbit, hobbit, or breast has been known to speak up in reply to their exploiters."

Her stories, although shaped by her imagination, are loosely based on tales told to her by her mother and grandmother of their life in rural Indiana. The Birdwells of her books The Friendly Persuasion and  'Except for Me and Thee' are based on Joshua and Elizabeth Milhous, the great-grandparents she shares with President Nixon.

The Friendly Persuasion
The Friendly Persuasion (1945) is West's most well-known work. New York Times book reviewer Orville Prescott called it "as fresh and engaging, tender and touching a book as ever was called sentimental by callous wretches... There have been plenty of louder and more insistent books this year, but few as sure and mellow as The Friendly Persuasion."

The novel was adapted into the 1956 movie Friendly Persuasion, starring Gary Cooper and directed by William Wyler. It was nominated for an Academy Award for Best Picture. To See the Dream, an autobiographical book, described her experiences as the movie's script writer.

Except for Me and Thee, the sequel to The Friendly Persuasion, was adapted into a 1975 television movie, titled Friendly Persuasion, starring Richard Kiley.

Cress Delahanty
Cress Delahanty (1953) is a collection of short stories about a sensitive and artistic teenage girl growing up in rural Orange County, California. Some of the stories were previously published in magazines including The New Yorker, Woman's Day and The Ladies' Home Journal. The book was a Book of the Month Club selection for January 1954. Los Angeles Times book reviewer Milton Merlin calls it, "a richly rewarding story of five mysterious, unpredictable and adventurous years in a girl's life on a Southern California ranch....Jessamyn West never reaches out for spectacular incidents. She doesn't have to, for growing up has enough excitement, amusement and heartbreak in itself for any novel. This is one that you'll remember and that will make you remember."

Published works
 The Friendly Persuasion – 1945
 A Mirror for the Sky – 1948
 The Witch Diggers – 1951
 Cress Delahanty – 1953
 Love, Death, and the Ladies' Drill Team – 1955
 To See the Dream
 Love Is Not What You Think – 1959
 South of the Angels – 1960
 The Quaker Reader – 1962
 A Matter of Time – 1966
 Leafy Rivers – 1967
 Except for Me and Thee – 1969
 Crimson Ramblers of the World, Farewell – 1970
 Hide and Seek – 1973
 The Secret Look – 1974
 The Massacre at Fall Creek – 1975
 The Life I really Lived
 The Woman Said Yes – 1976
 Double Discovery
 The State of Stony Lonesome
 Collected Stories of Jessamyn West

References

External links

 
 "Jessamyn West" by Ann Dahlstrom Farmer in the Western Writers Series Digital Editions at Boise State University
 2 short radio episodes of West's writing from California Legacy Project.
Jessamyn West", Our Land, Our Literature
Jessamyn West", enotes

1902 births
1984 deaths
20th-century American novelists
20th-century American women writers
American Christian socialists
American Quakers
American women novelists
American women short story writers
People from Orange County, California
People from Vernon, Indiana
Quaker socialists
Whittier College alumni
Novelists from Indiana
20th-century American short story writers
20th-century Quakers
Novelists from California
Female Christian socialists
Nixon family